The 2003 Giro di Lombardia was the 97th edition of the Giro di Lombardia cycle race and was held on 18 October 2003. The race started in Como and finished in Bergamo. The race was won by Michele Bartoli of the Fassa Bortolo team.

General classification

References

2003
2003 in road cycling
2003 in Italian sport
2003 UCI Road World Cup
October 2003 sports events in Europe